Yu Xiusong (1899 – February 21, 1939) was an early member of the Chinese Communist Party. He was born in Zhuji, Zhejiang. He started attending the Zhejiang First Normal School (currently Hangzhou High School) in 1916. The May 4 movement of 1919 led him to be a student activist. In 1920, he founded the Communist Youth League of China and became its first leader. In 1922, he supported the Constitutional Protection Movement of Sun Yat-sen. As a result of the First United Front in 1924, Yu was given a position in his home province by the Kuomintang. In October 1925, Yu went to the Soviet Union to study at Moscow Sun Yat-sen University, where he became acquainted with Wang Ming. In 1933, he was in the Soviet Far East. He arrived in Xinjiang in the summer of 1935. He was married to the sister of local warlord Sheng Shicai. At the instigation of Kang Sheng, Wang had Deng Fa arrest Yu on charges of Trotskyism sometime between December 10 and 27, 1937. In May or June 1938, Yu was extradited back to the Soviet Union. He was sentenced to death and executed in Moscow. Yu's death marked the final break between Wang and Zhang Guotao. In 1962, after the Sino-Soviet split, Yu was posthumously proclaimed a revolutionary martyr.

External links
蒙难半个世纪的国际冤案追踪

1899 births
1939 deaths
Chinese Communist Party politicians from Zhejiang
Moscow Sun Yat-sen University alumni
Great Purge victims
People executed by the Soviet Union
Chinese people executed abroad
Executed communists